Île des Pins Airport is an airport on Île des Pins in New Caledonia .

Airlines and destinations

Statistics

References

Airports in New Caledonia